Birkenhead Hamilton Square railway station (commonly shortened to Hamilton Square station) serves the town of Birkenhead, in Merseyside, England, on the Wirral Line of the Merseyrail network. The station is close to Hamilton Square in Birkenhead.

History 
Hamilton Square station was built by the Mersey Railway and opened on 1 February 1886. The station building was designed by G. E. Grayson in Italianate style, and has been designated as a Grade II listed building. It stood on that railway's original route from James Street station in Liverpool to Green Lane, later extended to Rock Ferry and Birkenhead Park. Just south of the station, the lines towards Rock Ferry and Birkenhead Park diverge; this junction was originally built as a flat crossing.

With the platforms being at a deep level, three hydraulic lifts were provided to transport passengers from ground level to the platforms and back, as well as flights of steps. Each lift was able to accommodate up to 100 passengers at a time and took 45 seconds to travel in each direction. The lifts were installed by Easton and Anderson.

By 1970  all-electric lifts were in operation, each with a capacity of 70 persons, these lifts having the Ward Leonard control system, which gave gentle stops and starts, blistering acceleration, and a fast transit time.

The first electric train passenger service ran through the station on 3 May 1903, with a 650 V DC fourth rail system and Mersey Railway electric units built by Westinghouse. Despite the journey being far quicker than travel aboard the Mersey Ferry service, passengers were not keen on travelling underground due to the smoke from the previous coal-powered steam locomotives.  A Frequent electric trains sign was erected on the outside of the station's large hydraulic lift tower (slightly below the position of the present sign) to publicise these cleaner trains. The booking hall had a central ticket office, as was popular on the London Underground.

In the 1970s, as part of the expansion programme of the Merseyrail network, a burrowing junction was built at Hamilton Square so that trains heading towards New Brighton and West Kirby did not have to cross the path of trains coming from Rock Ferry on the flat crossing. Along with the construction of the loop tunnel in the centre of Liverpool, this improved the capacity of the Wirral Line, allowing increased train frequencies.

As part of the project, Hamilton Square gained a new platform (Platform 3) for New Brighton and West Kirby services, and the rest of the station was refurbished. The signal box was closed on 9 May 1977, with signalling operation transferred to James Street, when Hamilton Square's burrowing junction and platform came into use. Unfortunately, this investment coincided with the significant decline in employment in Central Liverpool and surrounding areas, patronage fell, and the peak hour train service provided nowadays through the extensive grade-separated tunnel junctions is notably less than was provided in the 1960s-70s, just using the flat junction.

2014/15 refurbishment
In August 2014, it was announced that Hamilton Square was to be the fourth station to be refurbished as part of the £40 million investment from Network Rail which would see all Merseyrail Underground Stations excluding Conway Park refurbished. This included the refurbishment of platforms, concourses and the booking hall. The entire station closed on 29 September 2014 and reopened on 27 March 2015.

During the refurbishment, in November 2014 it was revealed that old historic posters dating back to the 1940s, 1950's and 1960's were found underneath the old wall cladding. These included posters promoting New Brighton, an advert for a Circus and old news stories from the Liverpool Echo. The posters however could not be saved due to their poor condition and were left where they were. However, during the reopening, artwork documenting the old posters was unveiled on Platform 1 of the station.

Facilities
The station is staffed, during all opening hours, and has platform CCTV. There are toilets, secure parking for 12 cycles, a payphone, an ATM, booking office, a ticket machine and live departure and arrival screens, for passenger information. The station does not have a car park though there is a drop-off point. Step-free access to the platforms, for wheelchairs and prams, is possible, via the lifts. The station also has steps to an exit on Shore Road, once open normally but now only used in emergencies. The station also has a shop, in the main booking hall, which opened in 2007 and which sells tickets and snacks. On 22 October 2015, free Wi-Fi was installed and introduced at the station.

Services 
During Monday-Saturday daytime, trains operate at least every five minutes to James Street and around the Liverpool city centre loop. At other times, trains operate every 30 minutes to each of these four destinations, giving a service every 5–10 minutes to Liverpool. These services are all provided by Merseyrail's fleet of Class 507 and Class 508 EMUs.

Gallery

See also
 Listed buildings in Birkenhead
 List of works by Grayson and Ould
 List of underground stations of the Merseyrail network

References

Sources

External links 

Buildings and structures in Birkenhead
DfT Category D stations
Hamilton Square
Railway stations in the Metropolitan Borough of Wirral
Former Mersey Railway stations
Railway stations in Great Britain opened in 1886
Railway stations served by Merseyrail
Railway stations located underground in the United Kingdom